"Why I Am" is the second single from American rock band Dave Matthews Band's album Big Whiskey & the GrooGrux King. It hit radio stations on July 27, 2009. The song is a tribute to former band member LeRoi Moore, who died on August 19, 2008. The song discusses death and the urgency of living. It was written before Moore's death and features his playing on it.

The song debuted live on April 14, 2009 at Madison Square Garden, alongside two other album songs, "Funny the Way It Is" (the first single) and "Spaceman".  The song was performed by the band on The Today Show, Late Show with David Letterman, The Tonight Show with Conan O'Brien, Late Night with Jimmy Fallon, Austin City Limits and Ellen, as well as Fuse Presents..., a show on the US television channel Fuse, which occurred on the same day as the release of Big Whiskey and the GrooGrux King (June 2, 2009).  

A music video for the song was recorded live in London, England and made its American debut on August 14, 2009 via MySpace.

Charts

References

2009 singles
Dave Matthews Band songs
Songs written by Dave Matthews
Songs written by Carter Beauford
Songs written by Stefan Lessard
Songs written by LeRoi Moore
Songs written by Boyd Tinsley
Song recordings produced by Rob Cavallo
2009 songs
RCA Records singles